Isopogon pruinosus is a species of flowering plant in the family Proteaceae and is endemic to southwestern Western Australia. It is a compact, spreading shrub with narrow egg-shaped leaves with the narrower end towards the base and spherical to elliptic heads of pink flowers.

Description
The leaves are glaucous, arranged alternately along the branchlets, and have smooth edges. The flowers are arranged in sessile, spherical to elliptic heads of sixteen to thirty-two flowers, the heads  in diameter with three to four whorls of broadly egg-shaped involucral bracts at the base. The flowers are red or pink and hairy, the hairs pressed against the surface.

Taxonomy
Isopogon pruinosus was first formally described in 2010 by the botanists Michael Hislop and Barbara Rye in the journal Nuytsia. In the same journal, Hislop and Rye described two subspecies and the names are accepted at the Australian Plant Census.
This subspecies mainly differs from the autonym in having involucral bract that are glabrous, or almost so.
This subspecies has densely hairy involucral bracts.

The specific epithet (pruinosus) means "frosted or covered with hoar frost", and refers to the white coating that is usually present on this species. The subspecies epithet glabellus means "without hairs" and refers to the almost glabrous involucral bracts of that subspecies.

Distribution and habitat
Both subspecies of Isopogon pruinosus grow in heath or mallee woodland in the Avon Wheatbelt, Esperance Plains and Mallee biogeographic regions. Subspecies glabellus occurs from Corrigin to north of Hyden and subspecies pruinosus from south-west of Hyden to Frank Hann National Park with a disjunct population in the Fitzgerald River National Park.

Conservation status
Both subspecies of I. pruinosus are classified as "not threatened" by the Western Australian Government Department of Parks and Wildlife.

References

External links 
 The Australasian Virtual Herbarium – Occurrence data for Isopogon pruinosus
 Google images: Isopogon pruinosus

pruinosus
Eudicots of Western Australia
Plants described in 2010
Taxa named by Barbara Lynette Rye